Alpine Ballad is a 1965 Soviet drama film directed by Boris Stepanov.

Plot 
The film takes place during the Great Patriotic War. The film tells about prisoners of war who work at a factory in the Alps and decide to escape.

Cast 
 Lyubov Rumyantseva as Julia Novelli 
 Stanislav Lyubshin as Ivan Tereshka
 Aleksey Kotrelev as Madman 
 Vladimir Belokurov as Austrian man
 Antonina Bendova as Postman
 Yuri Yurchenko as Golodai
 Gennadiy Vasilevskiy as Zandler 
 Galina Makarova as Pelagia
 Vyacheslav Kubarev as S.S. Man
 Aleksei Nesterov as Srebnikov

References

External links 
 

1965 films
1960s Russian-language films
Soviet drama films
1965 drama films
Belarusfilm films
Soviet black-and-white films
World War II prisoner of war films
Soviet World War II films
Films based on Russian novels
Films set in the Alps